Aeneas Silvius (said to have reigned 1110-1079 BC) is the son of Silvius, in some versions grandson of Ascanius and great-grandson, grandson or son of Aeneas. He is the third in the list of the mythical kings of Alba Longa in Latium, and the Silvii regarded him as the founder of their house. Dionysius of Halicarnassus ascribes to him a reign of 31 years. Ovid does not mention him among the Alban kings. According to Livy and Dionysius, the heir of Aeneas Silvius was named Latinus Silvius.

Family tree

References

Kings of Alba Longa
Characters in Book VI of the Aeneid